Spirotropis azorica is a species of sea snail, a marine gastropod mollusk in the family Drilliidae.

Description
The shell grows to a length of 11 mm.

Distribution
This marine species occurs in the demersal zone off the Azores at a depth of 330 m.

References

  Tucker, J.K. 2004 Catalog of recent and fossil turrids (Mollusca: Gastropoda). Zootaxa 682:1–1295
 Gofas, S.; Le Renard, J.; Bouchet, P. (2001). Mollusca, in: Costello, M.J. et al. (Ed.) (2001). European register of marine species: a check-list of the marine species in Europe and a bibliography of guides to their identification. Collection Patrimoines Naturels, 50: pp. 180–213

External links
 
 Holotype in MNHN, Paris

azorica
Gastropods described in 1980